This is a list of notable Austrian artists and architects.



A
 Josef Abel (1768–1818) painter 
 Erika Abels d'Albert (1896–1975), painter and graphic designer 
 Raimund Abraham (1933–2010) architect 
 Soshana Afroyim (1927–2015), painter 
 Joseph Matthäus Aigner (1818–1886) painter
 Oz Almog (born 1956) painter and writer 
 Franz Alt (1821–1914) artist, watercolorist 
 Rudolf von Alt (1812–1905) painter 
 Friedrich von Amerling (1803–1887) painter 
 Christian Attersee (born 1940) pop-art artist

B
 Ferdinand Bauer (1760–1826) botanical illustrator 
 Herbert Bayer (1900–1985) graphic designer, typographer, photographer, painter, architect 
 Franz von Bayros (1866–1924) erotic artist 
 Maria Bach (1896–1978), painter 
 Antonietta Brandeis(1849–1910) painter 
 Arik Brauer (1929–2021) painter; born in Vienna
 Günter Brus (born 1938) performance artist
 Tina Blau (1845–1916), landscape painter

C
 Bernhard Cella (born 1969) conceptual artist; born in Salzbug
 Eduard Charlemont (1848–1906) impressionist painter; born in Vienna 
 Isabel Czerwenka-Wenkstetten (born 1969), visual artist

D
 Günther Domenig (1934–2012) architect 
 Gerti Deutsch (1908–1979), photographer
 Karl Duldig (1902–1986), Austrian-Australian sculptor

E
 Joachim Eckl (born 1962)
 Albin Egger-Lienz (1868–1926) painter 
 Bettina Ehrlich (1903–1985) painter and illustrator
 Fanny Elssler (1810–1884) dancer 
 Ursula Endlicher, multi-media 
 Johann Bernhard Fischer von Erlach (1656–1723) architect 
 Valie Export (born 1940) media artist

F
 Bernd Fasching (born 1955) painter and sculptor; born in Vienna
 Marina Faust (born 1950), photographer
 Thomas Feuerstein (born 1968) media artist, bio artist, sculptor
 Josef Frank (1885–1967) architect
 Emil Fuchs (1866–1929) sculptor, medallist, painter
 Ernst Fuchs (1930–2015) painter and sculptor; born in Vienna 
 Joseph von Führich (1800–1876) painter; born in Kratzau, Austria-Hungary
 Hortensia Fussy (born 1954) sculptor

G
 Richard Gerstl (1883–1908) painter 
 Bruno Gironcoli (1936–2010) sculptor; born in Villach 
 Gareis, Fritz (1872–1925)  artist and cartoonist for the leftwing Vienna
 Hilda Goldwag (1912–2008)  painter
 Johannes Grenzfurthner (born 1975) founder of monochrom 
 Eva Grubinger (born 1970), installation artist 
 Nilbar Gures (born 1977), multi-media

H
 Ernst Haas (1921–1986) photographer 
 Jasmin Hagendorfer installation artist, sculpturer, performance artist
 Alice Berger Hammerschlag (1917–1969), abstract painter
 Karin Hannak (born 1940), multi-media 
 Edith Tudor Hart (1908–1973), photographer and spy 
 Karl Freiherr von Hasenauer (1833–1894) architect 
 Johann Hattey (1859–1904) architect 
 Rudolf Hausner (1914–1995) painter and graphic artist 
 Xenia Hausner (born 1951) painter 
 Gottfried Helnwein (born 1948) artist; born in Vienna
 Kurt Hentschlager (born 1960) new media artist; born in Linz
 Louis Christian Hess (1895–1944) painter and sculptor
 Johann Lukas von Hildebrandt (1668–1745) architect
 Adolf Hitler (1889–1945) painter
 Josef Hoffmann (1870–1956) architect 
 Hans Hollein (1934–2014) architect 
 Wilhelm Holzbauer (1930–2019) architect 
 Carl Holzmann (1849–1914) architect 
 Clemens Holzmeister (1886–1983) architect 
 Alfred Hrdlicka (1928–2009) sculptor and graphic artist; born in Vienna 
 Friedensreich Hundertwasser (1928–2000) artist; born in Vienna

I 
 Nicky Imber (1920–1996)

K
 Arnold Karplus (1877–1968) Viennese architect 
 Dora Kallmus (1881–1963), photographer 
 Manfred Kielnhofer (born 1967) designer and sculptor
 Ernestine von Kirchsberg (1857–1924), painter 
 Franz Klein (1779–1840) Viennese sculptor; creator of bust of Beethoven
 Gustav Klimt (1862–1918) artist; prominent figure of the Vienna Secession 
 Kiki Kogelnik (1935–1997) pop-art painter 
 Oskar Kokoschka (1886–1980) painter; born in Pöchlarn, Lower Austria
 Sacha Kolin (1911–1981), painter
 Michaela Konrad (born 1972), contemporary artist
 Edith Kramer (1916–2014), painter and art therapist
 Siegfried L. Kratochwil (1916–2005) Viennese painter
 Alfred Kubin (1877–1959) painter (graphics) 
 Max Kurzweil (1867–1916) artist; co-founder of the Vienna Secession 
 Elke Krystufek (born 1970) painter
 Felicitas Kuhn (1926–2022), illustrator

L
 Joseph Lanzedelly the Elder (1772–1831) – lithographer
 Maria Lassnig (1919–2014) painter; born in Vienna
 Roberta Lima (born 1974) – video and performance artist
 Adolf Loos (1870–1933) architect

M
 Marianne Maderna (born 1944), sculptor and illustrator
 Anna Mahler (1904–1988), sculptor
 Hans Makart (1840–1884) history painter, designer and decorator 
 Anton Erhard Martinelli (1684–1747) architect 
 Domenico Martinelli (1650–1719) architect 
 Franz Martinelli (1651–1708) architect 
 Johann Baptist Martinelli (1701–1754) architect
 Georg Mayer-Marton (1897–1960) artist
 Gustav Mezey (1899–1981)  painter of large scale posters 
 Edgar Meyer (1853–1925) painter and political activist 
 Josef Mikl (1929–2008) abstract painter
 Elizabeth Burger Monath (1907–1986), painter and illustrator
 Inge Morath (1923–2002) photographer 
 Koloman Moser (1868–1918) – artist
 Otto Muehl (1925–2013) artist, action art
 Ulrike Müller (born 1971), mixed-media artist

N
 Moritz Nähr (1859–1945) photographer
 Christian Heinrich Nebbien (1778–1841) landscaping architect 
 Richard Neutra (1892–1970) architect; emigrated to the United States
 Hans Niessenberger
 Hermann Nitsch (born 1938) painter and performance artist; born in Vienna

P
 Gustav Peichl (1928–2019) architect 
 Hubert Petschnigg (1913–1997) architect 
 Martina Pippal (born 1957), painter, sculptor and art historian 
 Boris Podrecca (born 1940)
 Alf Poier (born 1967) artist and stand-up comedian 
 Jakob Prandtauer (1660–1726) architect
 Thomas Pucher (born 1969) architect

R
 Arnulf Rainer (born 1929) painter
 Elise Ransonnet-Villez (1843–1899), painter
 Barbara Rapp (born 1972) painter and mixed-media artist
 Erwin Redl (born 1963) LED installation artist and painter
 Lily Renée (born 1921), illustrator and writer
 Lili Réthi (1894–1969), artist and illustrator
 Lucie Rie (1902–1995), potter
 Anton Pius Riegel (1789–18??) architect 
 Felice Rix-Ueno (1893–1967) textile artist
 Anton Romako (1832–1889), painter
 Johann Michael Rottmayr (1656–1730) Baroque painter
 Bernard Rudofsky (1905–1988) designer, architect and social critic

S
Stefan Sagmeister (born 1962) – graphic designer and typographer
Karin Schäfer (born 1963) – performance artist
Martina Schettina (born 1961) – mixed media artist
 Egon Schiele (1890–1918) painter
 Rudolf Schindler (1877–1953) architect; emigrated to the United States in 1914
 Lene Schneider-Kainer (1885–1971), painter
 Barbara Schurz (born 1973), performance artist and writer
 Paul Schuss (born 1948) painter and mixed media artist; emigrated to France in 1949
 Margarete Schütte-Lihotzky (1897–2000) architect and political activist 
 Karl Schwanzer (1918–1975) architect
 Hans Schwarz (1922–2003) artist 
 Rosa Schweninger (1849–1918), painter 
 Moritz von Schwind (1804–1871) painter 
 Florian Seidl (born 1979) vehicle designer 
 Harry Seidler (1923–2006) architect; emigrated to Australia in 1948
 Günther Selichar (born 1960)  media artist / photographer
 Deborah Sengl (born 1974), painter and sculptor
 Santino Solari (1576–1646) architect 
 Martina Steckholzer (born 1974), artist 
 Adalbert Stifter (1805–1868) painter, pedagogue, poet and writer
 Ceija Stojka (1933–2013), painter, writer and musician
 Marianne Stokes (1855–1927), painter
 Jörg Streli (1940–2019), architect

T
 Johann Joseph Thalherr (1730–1801) architect 
 Ottilie Tolansky (1912–1977), painter
 Hede von Trapp (1877–1947), painter, illustrator and poet 
 Esin Turan (born 1970), sculptor and painter

U
 Carola Unterberger-Probst (born 1978) painter, installations, experimental films, digital art

W
 Aloys Wach (1892–1940) painter 
 Otto Wagner (1841–1918) Jugendstil architect behind much of turn-of-the-century Viennese architecture 
 Ferdinand Georg Waldmüller (1793–1865) painter 
 Peter Weibel (born 1944) media artist
 Max Weiler (1910–2001) painter
 Susanne Wenger (1915–2009), painter and sculptor
 Franz West (1947–2012) artist 
 Olga Wisinger-Florian (1844–1926) painter 
 Fritz Wotruba (1907–1975) sculptor; born in Vienna
 Marie Elisabeth Wrede (1898–1981)  painter
 Erwin Wurm (born 1954) sculptor

Z 
 Roman Zenzinger (1903–1990) commercial designer and painter; born in Olmuetz 
 Liane Zimbler (1892–1987) architect and interior designer
 Lisbeth Zwerger (born 1954), illustrator

See also

 List of painters from Austria
 List of architects
 List of Austrians
 List of Austrian women artists
 List of Austrian women photographers
 Lists of artists
 ART.Welten, an Austrian artists' association

 
 
Austrians
Austrian
Artists and architects